Ćamil Sijarić (18 December 1913 – 6 December 1989) was a Yugoslavian novelist and short story writer. He enrolled in law school in 1936 and earned his degree four years later. Sijarić died in a car crash at the age of 75.

Life
He was born in Šipovice, near Bijelo Polje, in the Kingdom of Montenegro, to Muslim  parents. He was of Albanian origin on his mothers side, and he considered Albanian to be native to him. 
Both of his parents died while he was a child.
He was raised thereafter by his aunts and uncles. 
 
Sijarić enrolled in the University of Belgrade's Law School and earned his degree in 1940. He was both a member of Montenegrin Academy of Sciences and Arts, and Academy of Arts and Sciencies of Bosnia and Herzegovina.

His first literary work was Ram-Bulja (1953), which he first wrote in Albanian but then later translated and first it in published Serbian. It was thereafter re-translated into Albanian shortly after because, according to Sijarić, the characters there themselves can be seen as Albanians. His most acclaimed work is the novel Bihorci (1955). 

He spent most of his life in Skopje, Belgrade and later, Sarajevo, where he died in a car accident in 1989. However, almost all his major works are about Montenegro and the Bihor region around Bijelo Polje. His works have been translated in more than a dozen languages, including Russian, German and French.

Sijarić perished in a car crash in Sarajevo, shortly before his 76th birthday in December 1989.

Not long before his death, Sijarić wrote a poem called Znam (I Know), which appears to show him foreshadowing his own death:

Bibliography
Some of his most important works are
Ram-Bulja (stories, 1953)
Bihorci (novel, 1955)
Mojkovacka bitka ("The Battle of Mojkovac", novel, 1968)
Sablja (stories, 1969)
Konak (novel, 1971)
Carska vojska ("Imperial Army", novel, 1976)
Francuski pamuk ("French Cotton", stories, 1980)

References

1913 births
1989 deaths
Montenegrin people of Albanian descent
University of Belgrade Faculty of Law alumni
People from Bijelo Polje
Montenegrin Muslims
Albanian male writers
Montenegrin novelists
Montenegrin short story writers
Members of the Montenegrin Academy of Sciences and Arts
20th-century novelists
Road incident deaths in Yugoslavia
20th-century short story writers
Bosnia and Herzegovina people of Albanian descent
Bosnia and Herzegovina people of Montenegrin descent
Bosnia and Herzegovina writers